The 2nd Infantry Division of Nazi Germany's Army was created from components of the Reichswehr's old 2nd Division in 1934, at first under the cover name Wehrgauleitung Stettin and later Artillerieführer II; it did not take its real name until October 1935. It was upgraded to 2nd Motorized Infantry Division in 1937, and fought under that name in Heinz Guderian's XIX Corps during the 1939 Invasion of Poland, first in the cut across the Polish Corridor to reach East Prussia and then as support for the push on Brest-Litovsk. It was then transferred to the west, where it took part in the 1940 Battle of France.

In October 1940 the division was reorganized as the 12th Panzer Division.

Commanding officers

 Generalleutnant Hubert Gercke (10 October 1935 – 1 April 1937)
 Generalleutnant Paul Bader (1 April 1937 – 1 October 1940)

References 
Note: The Web references may require you to follow links to cover the unit's entire history.

 Burkhard Müller-Hillebrand: Das Heer 1933–1945. Entwicklung des organisatorischen Aufbaues.  Vol.III: Der Zweifrontenkrieg. Das Heer vom Beginn des Feldzuges gegen die Sowjetunion bis zum Kriegsende. Mittler: Frankfurt am Main 1969, p. 285.
 Georg Tessin: Verbände und Truppen der  deutschen Wehrmacht und Waffen-SS im Zweiten Weltkrieg, 1939 – 1945. Vol. II: Die Landstreitkräfte 1 – 5.  Mittler: Frankfurt am Main 1966.
 Georg Tessin: Verbände und Truppen der  deutschen Wehrmacht und Waffen-SS im Zweiten Weltkrieg, 1939 – 1945. Vol. III: Die Landstreitkräfte 6 – 14.  Mittler: Frankfurt am Main 1967.

0*002
Military units and formations established in 1934
1934 establishments in Germany
Military units and formations disestablished in 1941

bg:12-та танкова дивизия (Вермахт)
de:12. Panzer-Division (Wehrmacht)
ko:독일 12 기갑사단
it:12. Panzer-Division (Wehrmacht)
sv:12. Panzer-Division